Prafulla Chandra Ghosh (24 December 1891 – 18 December 1983) was the first Premier of West Bengal, India from 15 August 1947 to 14 August 1948. He also served as the Chief Minister of West Bengal in the "Progressive Democratic Alliance Front" government from 2 November 1967 to 20 February 1968.

Early life
Prafulla Chandra Ghosh was born in a Yadav Family on 24 December 1891 at a remote village, Malikanda, in Dhaka district, British India (now Bangladesh) as son of Purna Chandra Ghosh and Binodini Devi. Both his parents were religious devout and simple persons. Prafulla Ghosh was a brilliant student throughout his academic life and always stood first with scholarship. Prafulla had very rural upbringing and enjoyed cultural festivals such as Jatra, Kirtan, Padavali Gan, and also participated in agricultural activities.

Prafulla first attended Jagannath College and then moved to Dhaka where he graduated with B. A. (First Class First) and B. Sc (Chemistry) in 1913. In 1916, he obtained his M. A. and M. Sc (Chemistry) as first class first in both. Immediately, he joined research in Chemistry at Dhaka University. In 1919, he joined Presidency College, Calcutta as Demonstrator. In Jan 1920, he started work at Calcutta Mint as ASA master and he was the first Indian to be employed in that position. He was awarded doctorate in 1920 in Chemistry by Calcutta University.

Political life
Ghosh developed an interest in the Swadeshi Movement early on, but was most impressed and inspired by the ideas of armed revolution propagated by the Dhaka Anushilan Samiti, which he joined in 1909. However, the methods of the Samiti for raising money through theft and then defending the same in Court eventually alienated him, and he finally quit in 1913 to focus on academia. During the same time, while working for the Damodar flood relief, he met Surendranath Banerjee and other moderate leaders. Yogendra Nath Saha introduced him to the non-violent principles of Mahatma Gandhi. At the beginning, Gandhian principles did not impress him but he was moved by Gandhi's speech at Dhaka in December 1920 and soon afterwards met with him in Calcutta. In January 1921, he resigned from his position at the Calcutta Mint and along with other members of the Anami Sangh joined the Freedom Struggle.

Family
His great-granddaughter is Priyanka Yoshikawa, who won the 2016 Miss World Japan contest.

Bibliography
 The theory of profits
 India as known to ancient and mediaeval Europe
 Mahatma Gandhi, as I saw him
 West today
 Jībana-smr̥tira bhūmikā
 Mahātmā Gāndhī
 Prācīna Bhāratīẏa sabhyatāra itihāsa

References

1891 births
1983 deaths
Bengali Hindus
Politicians from Kolkata
University of Calcutta alumni
Chief Ministers of West Bengal
Academic staff of the University of Calcutta
Chief ministers from Indian National Congress
Indian National Congress politicians from West Bengal
20th-century Indian politicians
People from Dhaka District
Pogose School alumni